Meli Codro is a Fijian footballer who plays as a midfielder. for Suva F.C.

International career
Codro made his debut for the Fiji national football team in a 1-1 draw against Malaysia on 27 June 2016.

References 

Living people
1985 births
Fijian footballers
Fiji international footballers
Association football midfielders
Ba F.C. players